Balan (also Romanized as Bālān) is a village in Misheh Pareh Rural District, in the Central District of Kaleybar County, East Azerbaijan Province, Iran. At the 2006 census, its population was 90, in 11 families.

Balan was famous for the quality of the carpets which were woven there. These carpets, known as **Balan Rug**, had a size of approximately 1x4 m2 and a characteristic pattern. The village also produced turnips prized in surrounding villages for its taste. Finally, Safar Khan, the legendary orthopedist was thought to have acquired his talent via divine intervention.

Balan has a significant potential for ecotourism due to its proximity to the pastures of Agdash. In past the location was a transient for migrating nomads of Mohammad Khanlu tribe. Early in May, the tribes would halt there for few days before leaving for their summer quarters. Nowadays, the number of nomads have dwindled, still  few nomadic families occasionally pitch their tents on the hill-tops.

References 

Populated places in Kaleybar County
Kurdish settlements in East Azerbaijan Province